The 1908 Mercer Baptists football team represented Mercer University as a member of the Southern Intercollegiate Athletic Association (SIAA) during the 1908 college football season. They finished with a record of 3–4 and outscored their opponents 131–59.

Schedule

References

Mercer
Mercer Bears football seasons
Mercer Baptists football